Robin Lee McKendrick (born 2 July 1943, Ulverstone, Tasmania) is a former Independent member of the Tasmanian Legislative Council. He was first elected to the now abolished Division of Cornwall on 26 May 1984. He held the seat for one term but was defeated in 1990 by Ray Bailey.

References
 

Members of the Tasmanian Legislative Council
People from Ulverstone, Tasmania
1943 births
Living people
Independent members of the Parliament of Tasmania
20th-century Australian politicians